The 1923 Chinese presidential election was the election held on 5 October 1923 in Beijing for the third term of the President of China. Zhili warlord Cao Kun won the election through bribery.

The capital was under control of the Zhili Clique after the Zhili–Anhui War. In 1922 the Zhili warlords Wu Peifu and Cao Kun restored the "old" parliament elected in 1912. Cao bribed the congressmen to elect him President, personally paying members 5,000 yuan each starting on the 1st of October. This was done in the name of payment of arrears, as members had not been paid regularly for some time. On October 3rd, Representative Shao Ruipeng of Zhejiang Province took photos of the checks given to members and reported it to the Beijing prosecutor's office. On October 5th, Cao received a large majority of the votes cast. There were 12 spoiled ballots, such as one for bandit Sun Meiyao, who was responsible for the Lincheng Outrage. There was also a ballot cast for "5,000 yuan".

The bribery scandal led to the collapse of Cao's presidency and dismissal of the parliament on 24 November 1924, after the Cao's defeat in the Second Zhili–Fengtian War in 1924.

Results

President

See also
Beiyang government
History of the Republic of China
President of the Republic of China
1912 Chinese National Assembly election
Zhili clique

Citations

References
 中央選舉委員會，中華民國選舉史，台北：中央選舉委員會印行，1987年

Presidential elections in the Republic of China (1912–1949)
1923 in China
China
China